Synoplotherium (synonym Dromocyon) is an extinct genus of relatively small, wolf-like mesonychids that lived 50 million years ago, in what is now Wyoming.

 
Synoplotherium coexisted with its larger relative, Mesonyx. Very little else remains known about this mesonychid since its discovery in 1875.

Pathology 
The specimen of Synoplotherium on display at the Peabody Museum of Natural History has a fractured lower jaw. The jaw is cracked right at the midpoint and shows signs of healing. Evidence in the form of its worn down teeth show the animal survived to old age.

References

Mesonychids
Eocene mammals of North America
Eocene life
Fossil taxa described in 1872
Prehistoric placental genera